Edmund Trafford (c. 1560 – 8 May 1620), of Trafford, Lancashire, was an English Member of Parliament.

He represented Newton in 1589 and 1593.

References

1560s births
1620 deaths
Members of the Parliament of England (pre-1707) for constituencies in Lancashire
English MPs 1589
English MPs 1593